Peter MacGowan (born 26 November 1958) is a Canadian rower. He competed in the men's double sculls event at the 1984 Summer Olympics.

References

External links
 

1958 births
Living people
Canadian male rowers
Olympic rowers of Canada
Rowers at the 1984 Summer Olympics
Rowers from Toronto